Charana is an Indomalayan genus of hairstreak butterflies in the family Lycaenidae.

Species
Charana mandarinus (Hewitson, 1863)
Charana cepheis de Nicéville, 1894 Assam

References

Iolaini
Lycaenidae genera
Taxa named by Lionel de Nicéville